Montana De La Rosa (née Stewart) (born February 14, 1995) is an American mixed martial artist (MMA). She currently competes in the Flyweight division in the Ultimate Fighting Championship (UFC).

Background
De La Rosa was born in Helena, Montana, United States, but grew up in Azle, Texas. She started training in wrestling at Azle High School and after faring well in both state and national competition she was offered a scholarship to Oklahoma City University. However, as a teenage mom she quickly transferred back to Texas where she attends Tarrant County College, majoring in kinesiology, De La Rosa started training Brazilian jiu-jitsu after she graduated in 2013 and later transitioned to MMA.

Mixed martial arts career

Early career 
De La Rosa started her professional MMA career in 2014. She was the formal Xtreme Fighting League (XFN) flyweight champion and amassed a record of 7–4 prior participated in The Ultimate Fighter 26 UFC TV MMA competition series which she was subsequently signed by UFC after the show.

The Ultimate Fighter
In August 2017, it was announced that De La Rosa was one of the fighters featured on The Ultimate Fighter 26, UFC TV series, where the process to crown the UFC's inaugural 125-pound women's champion will take place. In the opening round, De La Rosa faced Ariel Beck and she won the fight D'Arce choke in round one. In the quarterfinals, she faced Nicco Montaño and lost the bout via unanimous decision.

Ultimate Fighting Championship
De La Rosa made her UFC debut on December 1, 2017, on The Ultimate Fighter 26 Finale against Christina Marks. She won the fight via a submission in round one.

Her next fight came on July 6, 2018, at The Ultimate Fighter 27 Finale against Rachael Ostovich. She won the fight via a rear-naked choke in round three.

On February 10, 2019, De La Rosa faced Nadia Kassem at UFC 234. She won the fight via a submission in round two. The win earned her the Performance of the Night bonus.

De La Rosa faced Andrea Lee on June 22, 2019, at UFC Fight Night 154. She lost the fight by unanimous decision.

De La Rosa faced Mara Romero Borella on February 15, 2020, at UFC Fight Night 167. She won the fight via unanimous decision.

De La Rosa was scheduled to face Maryna Moroz on September 5, 2020, at UFC Fight Night 176. However, Moroz was forced to withdraw from the event due to visa issues and she was replaced by Viviane Araújo. De La Rosa lost the fight via unanimous decision.

De La Rosa was scheduled to face Taila Santos, replacing Maryna Moroz, on December 5, 2020, at UFC on ESPN 19. However, the fight was removed from the event after one of De La Rosa's cornermen tested positive for COVID-19.

De La Rosa faced Mayra Bueno Silva on February 27, 2021, at UFC Fight Night 186. After three rounds of fighting, the fight ended with a draw from the judges.

De La Rosa faced Ariane Lipski on June 5, 2021, at UFC Fight Night: Rozenstruik vs. Sakai. She won via TKO in the second round, the first of her career.

De La Rosa was expected to face Maycee Barber on December 11, 2021, at UFC 269. However, De La Rosa pulled out of the fight in early October citing injury. While not officially confirmed by the promotion, officials are expected to leave the matchup intact and reschedule it for a future event.

De La Rosa faced Maycee Barber on April 23, 2022, at UFC Fight Night 205. She lost the fight via unanimous decision.

De La Rosa  faced Tatiana Suarez on February 25, 2023, at UFC Fight Night 220. She lost the fight via a submission in round two.

Personal life 
De La Rosa is married to Mark De La Rosa, who was also a UFC fighter. Montana has a daughter named Zaylyn from her previous relationship.

Championships and accomplishments

Mixed martial arts
Ultimate Fighting Championship
Performance of the Night (One time) 
 Tied (Erin Blanchfield) for second most submissions in UFC Women's Flyweight division history (3)

Xtreme Fighting League
 Xtreme Fighting League Flyweight Championship (One time)

Wrestling
High school wrestling
 All-American (Three times)

Mixed martial arts record

|-
|Loss
|align=center|12–8–1
|Tatiana Suarez
|Submission (guillotine choke)
|UFC Fight Night: Muniz vs. Allen
|
|align=center|2
|align=center|2:51
|Las Vegas, Nevada, United States
|
|-
|Loss
|align=center|12–7–1
|Maycee Barber
|Decision (unanimous)
|UFC Fight Night: Lemos vs. Andrade
|
|align=center|3
|align=center|5:00
|Las Vegas, Nevada, United States
|
|-
|Win
|align=center|12–6–1
|Ariane Lipski
|TKO (punches)
|UFC Fight Night: Rozenstruik vs. Sakai 
|
|align=center|2
|align=center|4:27
|Las Vegas, Nevada, United States
|
|-
|Draw
|align=center|
|Mayra Bueno Silva
|Draw (majority)
|UFC Fight Night: Rozenstruik vs. Gane 
|
|align=center|3
|align=center|5:00
|Las Vegas, Nevada, United States
|
|-
|Loss
|align=center|11–6
|Viviane Araújo
|Decision (unanimous)
|UFC Fight Night: Overeem vs. Sakai
|
|align=center|3
|align=center|5:00
|Las Vegas, Nevada, United States
|
|-
|Win
|align=center|11–5
|Mara Romero Borella
|Decision (unanimous)
|UFC Fight Night: Anderson vs. Błachowicz 2 
|
|align=center|3
|align=center|5:00
|Rio Rancho, New Mexico, United States
|
|-
|Loss
|align=center|10–5
|Andrea Lee
|Decision (unanimous)
|UFC Fight Night: Moicano vs. Korean Zombie 
|
|align=center|3
|align=center|5:00
|Greenville, South Carolina, United States
|
|-
|Win
|align=center| 10–4
|Nadia Kassem
|Submission (armbar)
|UFC 234
|
|align=center| 2
|align=center| 2:37
|Melbourne, Australia
|
|-
|Win
|align=center| 9–4
|Rachael Ostovich
|Submission (rear-naked choke)
|The Ultimate Fighter: Undefeated Finale
|
|align=center| 3
|align=center| 4:21
|Las Vegas, Nevada, United States
|
|-
|Win
|align=center| 8–4
|Christina Marks
|Submission (armbar)
|The Ultimate Fighter: A New World Champion Finale
|
|align=center| 1
|align=center| 2:00
|Las Vegas, Nevada, United States
|
|-
|Win
|align=center| 7–4
|Kathina Lowe
|Submission (armbar)
|XFN 342: Superfights
|
|align=center| 3
|align=center| 2:03
|Tulsa, Oklahoma, United States
|
|-
|Loss
|align=center| 6–4
|Cynthia Calvillo
|TKO (punches)
|LFA 1
|
|align=center| 3
|align=center| 2:54
|Dallas, Texas, United States
|
|-
|Loss
|align=center| 6–3
|Mackenzie Dern
|Submission (rear-naked choke)
|Legacy FC 61
|
|align=center| 1
|align=center| 3:25
|Dallas, Texas, United States
|
|-
|Win
|align=center| 6–2
|Miki Rogers
|Decision (unanimous)
|Xtreme Fight Night 335
|
|align=center| 3
|align=center| 5:00
|Grant, Oklahoma, United States 
|
|-
|Win
|align=center| 5–2
|Mellony Geugjes
|Decision (unanimous)
|SCC: Preserving the Arts
|
|align=center| 3
|align=center| 3:00
|Fort Worth, Texas, United States
|
|-
|Win
|align=center| 4–2
|Francis Hernandez
|Submission (rear-naked choke)
|Xtreme Fight Night
|
|align=center| 3
|align=center| 1:58
|Grant, Oklahoma, United States
|
|-
|Win
|align=center| 3–2
|Katie Ross Scharmer
|Submission (rear-naked choke)
|Savage Entertainment: Oktoberfist 4
|
|align=center| 2
|align=center| 2:41
|Savage, Minnesota, United States
|
|-
|Win
|align=center| 2–2
|Roxanne Ceasear
|Submission (armbar)
|TPFP: Premier Fight Series 4
|
|align=center| 2
|align=center| 1:55
|Midland, Texas, United States
|
|-
|Win
|align=center| 1–2
|Colby Fletcher
|Submission (armbar)
|XFL: Rumble On The River 12: Insanity
|
|align=center| 1
|align=center| 1:03
|Tulsa, Oklahoma, United States
|
|-
|Loss
|align=center| 0–2
|Maylene Estudillo
|Decision (unanimous)
|Rocks Xtreme MMA 11
|
|align=center| 3
|align=center| 3:00
|Corpus Christi, Texas, United States
|
|-
|Loss
|align=center| 0–1
|Jazmin Quezada
|Decision (split)
|24/7 Entertainment 17: Tyranny
|
|align=center| 3
|align=center| 3:00
|Midland, Texas, United States
|
|-

Mixed martial arts exhibition record

| Loss
| align=center| 1–1
| Nicco Montaño
| Decision (unanimous)
|rowspan=2| The Ultimate Fighter: A New World Champion
|  (airdate)
| align=center| 2
| align=center| 5:00
|rowspan=2| Las Vegas, Nevada, United States
| 
|-
| Win
| align=center| 1–0
| Ariel Beck
| Submission (D'Arce choke)
|  (airdate)
| align=center| 1
| align=center| 2:52
|

See also
List of current UFC fighters
List of female mixed martial artists

References

External links
 
 

Living people
1995 births
Flyweight mixed martial artists
Mixed martial artists utilizing wrestling
Mixed martial artists utilizing Brazilian jiu-jitsu
Sportspeople from Montana
American practitioners of Brazilian jiu-jitsu
American female mixed martial artists
American female sport wrestlers
Amateur wrestlers
Mixed martial artists from Montana
Sportspeople from Helena, Montana
Ultimate Fighting Championship female fighters
21st-century American women